Sutlepa is a village in Lääne-Nigula Parish, Lääne County, in western Estonia.

Wooden Sutlepa chapel from the 17th century was moved to Estonian Open Air Museum in Tallinn in 1970.

See also
 Sutlepa meri

References
 

Villages in Lääne County